The Industries Mécaniques Maghrébines S.A. (IMM) are a Tunisian car manufacturer headquartered in the city of Kairouan. The company was founded in 1982 by GM and other investors and closed for the first time in 1988; the plant was reopened in 1991. Since then, the manufacturer has formed subsidiaries to distribute its vehicles in Carthage, Tunis and Oued Smar, Algeria.

The company is owned by General Motors and Isuzu.

In January 2008, it was announced that the Algerian subsidiary will be converted for the assembly of vehicles, up to 25,000 units a year.

In Kairouan, IMM is manufacturing up to 4,000 units a year, marketed alongside the two local markets in Gibraltar, Morocco, Mauritania and Libya. The IMM is responsible for the supply of the markets of the Maghreb region and the Arab Maghreb Union.

In the 2011 Libyan civil war, Gaddafi's henchmen used vehicles to attack their own cities to spread fear and terror.

IMM is the only Tunisian car manufacturer besides Wallyscar. However, in Algeria SOVAC (VW), Elsecom Motors (Ford) and the RPA (Renault) are serious competitors.

Current models

Former models

References 

1982 establishments in Tunisia
2008 establishments in Algeria
Car manufacturers of Tunisia
General Motors joint ventures
Isuzu
Companies of Algeria
Manufacturing companies established in 1982
Manufacturing companies established in 1991
Kairouan